Wojciech Wacław Pokora (2 October 1934 – 4 February 2018) was a Polish actor. He has made over 40 appearances in film and television. He starred in the 1986–1987 television series Zmiennicy.

Selected filmography 
 Bad Luck (1960)
 Husband of His Wife (1961)
 Nieznany (1964)
 Marriage of Convenience (1967)
 The Cruise (1970)
 Hydrozagadka (1971)
 Man – Woman Wanted (1973)
 A Jungle Book of Regulations (1974)
 Brunet wieczorową porą (1976)
 What Will You Do When You Catch Me? (1978)
 Teddy Bear (1980)
 Czterdziestolatek

References

External links
 

1934 births
2018 deaths
Polish male film actors
Male actors from Warsaw